This is a partial listing of dams and reservoirs in Taiwan (Republic of China).

List of dams and reservoirs

See also 
 List of power stations in Taiwan

References 

 
 Reservoirs, dams and weirs of Taiwan (Taiwan Water Resources Agency)

 
 
Taiwan
Dams
Dams